is a Japanese voice actress and singer from Akita Prefecture who is a member of the idol group i☆Ris. She is affiliated with 81 Produce. She has also revealed that "Himika Akaneya" is not just her stage name, but her actual name as well.

Filmography

Television animation
Freezing Vibration (2013), Female Student B
Pretty Rhythm: Rainbow Live (2013), Customer 3
Noragami (2014), Nayu; Student A
Pretty Rhythm: All Star Selection (2014), Laala Manaka
PriPara (2014), Laala Manaka
SoniAni: Super Sonico the Animation (2014), Santa girl B
Dance with Devils (2015), Ritsuka Tachibana
Himōto! Umaru-chan (2015), Woman, Saleslady, Female Student, Female Announcer
Junjo Romantica 3 (2015), Girls
PriPara (2015), Laala Manaka
ReLIFE (2016), Honoka Tamarai
Izetta: The Last Witch (2016), Izetta
In Another World With My Smartphone (2017), Lapis
Land of the Lustrous (2017), Zircon
How to Keep a Mummy (2018), Asa Motegi
Magical Girl Site (2018), Tsuyuno Yatsumura
RErideD: Derrida, who leaps through time (2018), Yuri Dietrich
Rascal Does Not Dream of Bunny Girl Senpai (2018), Saki Kamisato
Million Arthur (2018–19), Nuckelavee
Mini Toji (2019), Mihono Asakura
Kiratto Pri Chan (2019), Maria Kanamori
King of Prism: Shiny Seven Stars as God IV
Magical Sempai (2019), Sister
Shachibato! President, It's Time for Battle! (2020), Subaru
Black Clover (2020), Dazuu Tayak

Film animation
Pretty Rhythm All-Star Selection the Movie: Prism Show Best Ten (2014), Magical Laala (Laala Manaka)
Love Live! School Idol Movie (2015), Star Idol
Gekijō-ban PriPara Mi~nna Atsumare! Prism Tours (2015), Laala Manaka
Tobidasu PriPara Mi~nna de Mezase! Idol Grand Prix (2015), Laala Manaka
PriPara Mi~nna no Akogare Let's Go PriPari (2016), Laala Manaka
Kacchikenee! (2016), Aiko
Dance with Devils: Fortuna (2017), Ritsuka Tachibana

Video game
Fate/Grand Order (2017), Caster of Oceanus/Circe
Xenoblade Chronicles 2 (2017), Raiko/Electra
Katana Maidens ~ Toji No Miko (2018), Mihono Asakura
Onsen Musume: Yunohana Collection (2018), Hana Ikaho
The Caligula Effect: Overdose (2018), Kuchinashi
Grand Summoners (2019), Tamae
Root/Film (2020), Riho
Action Taimanin (2021), Momochi Nagi

Film 

 Omaera Zenin Mendokusai! (2019), Eiko Enomoto

References

External links
Official agency profile 

1994 births
Living people
Voice actresses from Akita Prefecture
Japanese voice actresses
Japanese idols
Musicians from Akita Prefecture
81 Produce voice actors
Avex Group talents
Iris (Japanese band) members
Japanese people of Korean descent